Salikhovo (Sälix) is a rural locality (a selo) in Alkinsky Selsoviet, Chishminsky District, Bashkortostan, Russia. The population was 252 as of 2010. There are 4 streets.

Geography 
Sanzharovka is located 22 km northeast of Chishmy (the district's administrative centre) by road. Urazbakhty is the nearest rural locality.

References 

Rural localities in Chishminsky District